Jared James Tomich (born April 24, 1974 in St. John, Indiana) is a former American football defensive end in the National Football League. Tomich went to high school at Lake Central High School.  Lake Central recently retired his number.  Tomich played college football for the University of Nebraska. Jared came to Nebraska as a Proposition 48 (NCAA) partial qualifier, but ended up becoming an All-American in both 1995 and 1996.

He played for the New Orleans Saints from 1997-2000 after being drafted by them in the second round of the 1997 NFL Draft. He played one season for the Green Bay Packers in 2002-2003.

References

1974 births
Living people
People from St. John, Indiana
Players of American football from Indiana
American football defensive ends
New Orleans Saints players
Green Bay Packers players
Nebraska Cornhuskers football players